Max Ernst (2 April 1891 – 1 April 1976) was a German (naturalised American in 1948 and French in 1958) painter, sculptor, printmaker, graphic artist, and poet. A prolific artist, Ernst was a primary pioneer of the Dada movement and Surrealism in Europe. He had no formal artistic training, but his experimental attitude toward the making of art resulted in his invention of frottage—a technique that uses pencil rubbings of textured objects and relief surfaces to create images—and grattage, an analogous technique in which paint is scraped across canvas to reveal the imprints of the objects placed beneath. Ernst is noted for his unconventional drawing methods as well as for creating novels and pamphlets using the method of collages. He served as a soldier for four years during World War I, and this experience left him shocked, traumatised and critical of the modern world. During World War II he was designated an "undesirable foreigner" while living in France. He died in Paris on 1 April 1976.

Biography

Early life
Max Ernst was born in Brühl, near Cologne, the third of nine children of a middle-class Catholic family. His father Philipp was a teacher of the deaf and an amateur painter, a devout Christian and a strict disciplinarian. He inspired in Max a penchant for defying authority, while his interest in painting and sketching in nature influenced Max to take up painting. In 1909, Ernst enrolled in the University of Bonn to read philosophy, art history, literature, psychology and psychiatry. He visited asylums and became fascinated with the art work of the mentally ill patients; he also started painting that year, producing sketches in the garden of the Brühl castle, and portraits of his sister and himself. In 1911, Ernst befriended August Macke and joined his Die Rheinischen Expressionisten group of artists, deciding to become an artist.

In 1912, he visited the Sonderbund exhibition in Cologne, where works by Pablo Picasso and post-Impressionists such as Vincent van Gogh and Paul Gauguin profoundly influenced him. His work was exhibited that year together with that of the Das Junge Rheinland group, at Galerie Feldman in Cologne, and then in several group exhibitions in 1913. In his paintings of this period, Ernst adopted an ironic style that juxtaposed grotesque elements alongside Cubist and Expressionist motifs.

In 1914, Ernst met Hans Arp in Cologne. The two became friends and their relationship lasted for fifty years. After Ernst completed his studies in the summer, his life was interrupted by World War I. Ernst was drafted and served both on the Western and the Eastern Fronts. The effect of the war on Ernst was devastating; in his autobiography, he wrote of his time in the army thus: "On the first of August 1914 M[ax].E[rnst]. died. He was resurrected on the eleventh of November 1918". For a brief period on the Western Front, Ernst was assigned to chart maps, which allowed him to continue painting. Several German Expressionist painters died in action during the war, among them August Macke and Franz Marc.

Dada and surrealism

In 1918, Ernst was demobilised and returned to Cologne. He soon married art history student Luise Straus, of Jewish ancestry, whom he had met in 1914. In 1919, Ernst visited Paul Klee in Munich and studied paintings by Giorgio de Chirico. The same year, inspired by de Chirico and mail-order catalogues, teaching-aide manuals and similar sources, he produced his first collages (notably Fiat modes, a portfolio of lithographs), a technique which would dominate his artistic pursuits. Also in 1919, Ernst, social activist Johannes Theodor Baargeld and several colleagues founded the Cologne Dada group. In 1919–20, Ernst and Baargeld published various short-lived magazines such as Der Strom, die Schammade and organised Dada exhibitions.

Ernst and Luise's son Ulrich 'Jimmy' Ernst was born on 24 June 1920; he also became a painter. Ernst's marriage to Luise was short-lived. In 1921, he met Paul Éluard, who became a lifelong friend. Éluard bought two of Ernst's paintings (Celebes and Oedipus Rex) and selected six collages to illustrate his poetry collection Répétitions. A year later the two collaborated on Les malheurs des immortels and then with André Breton, whom Ernst met in 1921, on the magazine Littérature. In 1922, unable to secure the necessary papers, Ernst entered France illegally and settled into a ménage à trois with Éluard and his wife Gala in Paris suburb Saint-Brice, leaving behind his wife and son. During his first two years in Paris, Ernst took various odd jobs to make a living and continued to paint. In 1923, the Éluards moved to a new home in Eaubonne, near Paris, where Ernst painted numerous murals. The same year his works were exhibited at Salon des Indépendants.

Although apparently accepting the ménage à trois, Éluard eventually became more concerned about the affair. In 1924, he abruptly left, first for Monaco and then for Saigon. He soon asked his wife and Max Ernst to join him; both had to sell paintings to finance the trip. Ernst went to Düsseldorf and sold a large number of his works to a long-time friend, Johanna Ey, owner of gallery Das Junge Rheinland. After a brief time together in Saigon, the trio decided that Gala would remain with Paul. The Éluards returned to Eaubonne in early September, while Ernst followed them some months later, after exploring more of South-East Asia. He returned to Paris in late 1924 and soon signed a contract with Jacques Viot that allowed him to paint full-time. In 1925, Ernst established a studio at 22, rue Tourlaque.

In 1925, Ernst invented a graphic art technique called frottage (see Surrealist techniques), which uses pencil rubbings of objects as a source of images. He also created the 'grattage' technique, in which paint is scraped across canvas to reveal the imprints of the objects placed beneath. He used this technique in his famous painting Forest and Dove (as shown at the Tate Modern). The next year he collaborated with Joan Miró on designs for Sergei Diaghilev. With Miró's help, Ernst developed grattage, in which he trowelled pigment from his canvases. He also explored with the technique of decalcomania, which involves pressing paint between two surfaces. Ernst was also active, along with fellow Surrealists, at the Atelier 17.

Ernst developed a fascination with birds that was prevalent in his work. His alter ego in paintings, which he called Loplop, was a bird. He suggested that this alter-ego was an extension of himself stemming from an early confusion of birds and humans. He said that one night when he was young, he woke up and found that his beloved bird had died; a few minutes later, his father announced that his sister was born. Loplop often appeared in collages of other artists' work, such as Loplop presents André Breton. Ernst drew a great deal of controversy with his 1926 painting The Virgin Chastises the infant Jesus before Three Witnesses: André Breton, Paul Éluard, and the Painter. In 1927, Ernst married  and it is thought his relationship with her may have inspired the erotic subject matter of The Kiss and other works of that year. Ernst appeared in the 1930 film L'Âge d'Or, directed by the Surrealist Luis Buñuel. Ernst began to sculpt in 1934 and spent time with Alberto Giacometti. In 1938, the American heiress and artistic patron Peggy Guggenheim acquired a number of Max Ernst's works, which she displayed in her new gallery in London. Ernst and Peggy Guggenheim were married from 1942 to 1946.

World War II and later life

In September 1939, the outbreak of World War II caused Ernst to be interned as an "undesirable foreigner" in Camp des Milles, near Aix-en-Provence, along with fellow Surrealist, Hans Bellmer, who had recently emigrated to Paris. He had been living with his lover and fellow Surrealist painter, Leonora Carrington who, not knowing whether he would return, saw no option but to sell their house to repay their debts and leave for Spain. Thanks to the intercession of Paul Éluard and other friends, including the journalist Varian Fry, he was released a few weeks later. Soon after the German occupation of France, he was arrested again, this time by the Gestapo but managed to escape and flee to America with the help of Peggy Guggenheim, a member of a wealthy American art collecting family, and Fry. Ernst and Peggy Guggenheim arrived in the United States in 1941 and were married at the end of the year. Along with other artists and friends (Marcel Duchamp and Marc Chagall) who had fled from the war and lived in New York City, Ernst helped inspire the development of Abstract expressionism.

His marriage to Guggenheim did not last and in Beverly Hills, California in October 1946, in a double ceremony with Man Ray and Juliet P. Browner, he married American Surrealist painter Dorothea Tanning The couple made their home in Sedona, Arizona from 1946 to 1953, where the high desert landscapes inspired them and recalled Ernst's earlier imagery. Despite the fact that Sedona was remote and populated by fewer than 400 ranchers, orchard workers, merchants and small Native American communities, their presence helped begin what would become an American artists' colony. Among the monumental red rocks, Ernst built a small cottage with his own hands on Brewer Road and he and Tanning hosted intellectuals and European artists such as Henri Cartier-Bresson and Yves Tanguy. Sedona proved an inspiration for the artists and for Ernst, who compiled his book Beyond Painting and completed his sculptural masterpiece Capricorn while living in Sedona. As a result of the book and its publicity, Ernst began to achieve financial success. From the 1950s he lived mainly in France. In 1954 he was awarded the Grand Prize for painting at the Venice Biennale. He died at the age of 84 on 1 April 1976 in Paris and was interred at Père Lachaise Cemetery.

Legacy
Ernst's son Jimmy Ernst, a well-known German/American abstract expressionist painter, who lived on the south shore of Long Island, died in 1984. His memoirs, A Not-So-Still Life, were published shortly before his death. Max Ernst's grandson Eric and his granddaughter Amy are both artists and writers.

Max Ernst's life and career are examined in Peter Schamoni's 1991 documentary Max Ernst. Dedicated to the art historian Werner Spies, it was assembled from interviews with Ernst, stills of his paintings and sculptures, and the memoirs of his wife Dorothea Tanning and son Jimmy. The 101-minute German film was released on DVD with English subtitles by Image Entertainment.

The Max Ernst Museum opened in 2005 in his home town Brühl, Germany. It is housed in a late-classicist 1844 building integrated with a modern glass pavilion. The historic ballroom was once a popular social venue visited by Ernst in his youth. The collection spans 70 years of his career including paintings, drawings, frottages, collages, nearly the entire lithographic works, over 70 bronze sculptures. and more than 700 documents and photographs by Man Ray, Henri Cartier-Bresson, Lee Miller, and others. The core of the collection dates back to 1969 with works donated to the City of Brühl by the artist. Thirty-six paintings, gifts from the artist to his fourth wife Dorothea Tanning, are on permanent loan from the Kreissparkasse Köln. Some noteworthy works include the sculptures The King playing with the Queen (1944) and Teaching Staff for a School of Murderers (1967). The museum also host temporary exhibitions by other artist.

The Menil Collection, in Houston, Texas houses a significant collection of surrealist art including well over 100 pieces by Max Ernst. Notable paintings include In Praise of Freedom (1926), Loplop Presents Loplop (1930), Day and Night (1941–1942), Surrealism and Painting (1942), Euclid (1945), A Swarm of Bees in the Palais de Justice (1960), The Marriage of Heaven and Earth (1964). Ernst's work in the Menil Collection is typically exhibited a few pieces at a time along with other surrealist art in the collection on a rotating basis.

Exhibitions, retrospectives, and honors
 Venice Biennale, Venice (1954), received Grand Prize for Painting
 Musée National d'Art Moderne Paris (1959), awarded the Grand Prix national des arts
 Museum of Modern Art, New York (1961)
 Tate Gallery, London (1962)
 Kunsthaus Zürich (1963)
 Moderna Museet, Stockholm (1969)
 A retrospective of 104 works spanning the years 1920–1968, drawn entirely from the Menil Collection, toured Europe from 1970 to 1972 (Hamburger Kunsthalle, Kestnergesellschaft, Frankfurter Kunstverein, Academy of Arts, Berlin, Kunsthalle, Cologne, Musée de l'Orangerie, Musée Cantini, Maison de la Culture de Grenoble, Ancienne Douane (Strasbourg), Musée d'Arts de Nantes) and later the US (Nelson-Atkins Museum of Art, Fogg Art Museum, The Art Institute of Chicago, Solomon R. Guggenheim Museum). The opening of the exhibition in Paris was augmented with 44 pieces from various collations and opened on 2 April 1971, Max Ernst's 80th birthday.
 In 2005, "Max Ernst: A Retrospective" opened at the Metropolitan Museum of Art and included works such as Celebes (1921), Ubu Imperator (1923), and Fireside Angel (1937), which is one of Ernst's few definitively political pieces and is sub-titled The Triumph of Surrealism depicting a raging bird-like creature that symbolises the wave of fascism that enveloped Europe. The exhibition also includes Ernst's works that experiment with free association writing and the techniques of frottage, created from a rubbing from a textured surface; grattage, involving scratching at the surface of a painting; and decalcomania, which involves altering a wet painting by pressing a second surface against it and taking it away.
 Dada is Dada retrospective group exhibition at Bildmuseet, Umeå University, Sweden, running from 17 November 2017 to 20 May 2018.

Documentary images

Selected works

Early work, Germany (1891–1922)

First French period (1922–1940)

American period (1941–1952)

Second French period (1953–1976)

Prints, collages, and illustrations
 Illustrations for books by Paul Éluard: Répétitions (1922), Les malheurs des immortels (1922), Au défaut du silence (1925)
 Histoire Naturelle (ca. 1925–1926), a set of 34 collotypes after frottages
 La femme 100 têtes (1929, graphic novel)
 Rêve d'une petite fille qui voulut entrer au carmel (1930, graphic novel)
 Une Semaine de Bonté (1934, graphic novel)
 Illustrations for editions of works by Lewis Carroll: Symbolic Logic (1966, under the title Logique sans peine), The Hunting of the Snark (1968), and Lewis Carrols Wunderhorn (1970, an anthology of texts)
 Deux Oiseaux (1970, lithograph in colours)
 Aux petits agneaux (1971, lithographs)
 Paysage marin avec capucin (1972, illustrated book with essays by various authors)
 Maximiliana: the illegal practice of astronomy : hommage à Dorothea Tanning (1974, art book)
 Oiseaux en péril (1975, etchings with aquatint in colours; published posthumously)

See also
 List of German painters

Notes

References

Works cited

Further reading
 John Russell. Max Ernst: life and work (New York, H.N. Abrams, 1967) 
 Bodley Gallery (New York, N.Y.) Max Ernst : paintings, collages, drawings, sculpture : 30 October – 25 November 1961 : Bodley Gallery, 223 East 60, New York (exhibition catalogue and commentary; published by the gallery, 1961) 
 Max Ernst Books and Graphic Works. Institut fur Auslandsbeziehungen, 1977.
 
 David Hopkins. Marcel Duchamp and Max Ernst: The Bride Shared (Oxford, 1998).
 William Camfield. Max Ernst Dada and the Dawn of Surrealism (MoMA, 1993).

External links

 
 Max Ernst, A Retrospective, The Metropolitain Museum of Art
 Paintings in Museums and Public Art Galleries Worldwide, Artcyclopedia
 Works in the National Galleries of Scotland
 

 
1891 births
1976 deaths
German Army personnel of World War I
20th-century German painters
German male painters
Modern painters
Modern sculptors
Dada
Surrealist artists
German surrealist artists
University of Bonn alumni
People from Brühl (Rhineland)
People from the Rhine Province
People from Sedona, Arizona
Burials at Père Lachaise Cemetery
20th-century German sculptors
20th-century German male artists
German male sculptors
People of Montmartre
Guggenheim family
Atelier 17 alumni
German dadaists
German emigrants to the United States